Catutosaurus is an ophthalmosaurid ichthyosaur from the Late Jurassic Vaca Muerta Formation of Argentina. It contains a single species, C. gaspariniae.

References 

Fossil taxa described in 2021
Ophthalmosauridae